Brook Robertson (born 19 February 1994) is a New Zealand rower.

Born in Nelson in 1994, Robertson was educated at Nelson College from 2005 to 2011. He came fourth at the 2015 World Rowing Championships with the men's eight, qualifying the boat for the 2016 Olympics. He came sixth with his team at the eights competition in Rio de Janeiro.

References

External links
 
 

Living people
1994 births
New Zealand male rowers
Olympic rowers of New Zealand
Rowers at the 2016 Summer Olympics
Sportspeople from Nelson, New Zealand
People educated at Nelson College
Rowers at the 2020 Summer Olympics